Bethesda is an unincorporated community in southeastern Durham County, North Carolina, United States, on South Miami Boulevard, off  U.S. Route 70. The community has two churches, two schools, and a ZIP code of 27703. It has mostly been annexed into the city of Durham.

External links
 Bethesda at the U.S. Geographic Names Information System

Unincorporated communities in Durham County, North Carolina
Unincorporated communities in North Carolina